Beedle is a surname or given name which may refer to:

People:
 Ashley Beedle (born 1962), British DJ, producer and remixer
 Ernest A. Beedle (1933–1968), American lawyer and politician
 Martin Frosty Beedle (born 1961), British rock drummer
 George E. Beedle (born 1964), American politician, member of the Wisconsin State Assembly from 1903 to 1906
 Lynn S. Beedle (1917–2003), American structural engineer
 William Beedle Jr., real name of actor William Holden (1918–1981)

Fictional characters:
 The title character of J. K. Rowling's The Tales of Beedle the Bard
 Beedle, in The Legend of Zelda series
 The Japanese name of Weedle, a Pokémon species